Wu Tao-yan (born 4 December 1934) is a Taiwanese former sports shooter. He competed at five Summer Olympics between 1956 and 1972.

See also
 List of athletes with the most appearances at Olympic Games

References

External links
 
 ISSF Profile

1934 births
Living people
Taiwanese male sport shooters
Olympic shooters of Taiwan
Shooters at the 1956 Summer Olympics
Shooters at the 1960 Summer Olympics
Shooters at the 1964 Summer Olympics
Shooters at the 1968 Summer Olympics
Shooters at the 1972 Summer Olympics
Sportspeople from Shanghai
Asian Games medalists in shooting
Shooters at the 1958 Asian Games
Shooters at the 1966 Asian Games
Shooters at the 1970 Asian Games
Taiwanese people from Shanghai
Asian Games gold medalists for Chinese Taipei
Asian Games silver medalists for Chinese Taipei
Asian Games bronze medalists for Chinese Taipei
Medalists at the 1958 Asian Games
Medalists at the 1966 Asian Games
Medalists at the 1970 Asian Games
20th-century Taiwanese people